Stephen Everett Cox (born May 11, 1958) is a former American football punter and placekicker. Cox was drafted by the Cleveland Browns and played for them for four seasons. Cox played four more seasons for the Washington Redskins. Cox was one of the last straight-ahead style placekickers in the National Football League. 

Cox transferred to the University of Arkansas from Tulsa University following the 1977 season. After sitting out 1978 due to NCAA transfer rules, Cox added the punting job to his kicking duties. Steve was named All-Southwest Conference in 1979 and 1980, and was also named an All-American in 1980 by the UPI, the Sporting News, College & Pro Football Newsweekly, and Football News after leading the nation in punting by averaging 46.5 yards per punt. 

Cox was inducted into the Arkansas Sports Hall of Fame in 2004. 

Though primarily a punter and kickoff specialist, Cox was also used for long field goal attempts. On October 21, 1984, Cox kicked a 60-yard field goal in a game against Cincinnati. The kick was the second-longest field goal at the time (behind Tom Dempsey's record kick), but has since been matched by Morten Andersen, Rob Bironas, and Dan Carpenter and surpassed by Justin Tucker, Jason Elam, Matt Bryant, David Akers and twice by Sebastian Janikowski. Cox's kick remains one of only 26 field goals of 60 yards or more in NFL history and one of only two which was done with the straight-ahead style (the other being Tom Dempsey).

Cox earned a Super Bowl ring with the Washington Redskins in Super Bowl XXII. Cox punted four times and kicked off seven times for the Redskins.

1958 births
Living people
American football placekickers
American football punters
Arkansas Razorbacks football players
Cleveland Browns players
People from Charleston, Arkansas
Players of American football from Arkansas
Players of American football from Shreveport, Louisiana
Washington Redskins players